Off with Their Heads may refer to:

Off with Their Heads (band), an American punk band
Off with Their Heads (album), a 2008 album by Kaiser Chiefs
"Off with Their Heads" (song), a 2012 song by Devlin
 "Off with their heads!", a phrase spoken by the Queen of Hearts in Lewis Carroll's Alice's Adventures in Wonderland

See also
 Decapitation
Off with His Head, a 1957 novel by Ngaio Marsh
 Off with Her Head (EP), a 2010 EP by Huntress
 "Off With Her Head" (Batwoman), an episode of Batwoman
 "Heads Will Roll" (song), a 2009 song by Yeah Yeah Yeahs